Barbara A. Curran (August 26, 1940 – January 29, 2022) was an American politician, attorney, and judge who served as a member of the New Jersey General Assembly and New Jersey Superior Court.

Early life and education 
Curran was born in New York City. She earned a Bachelor of Arts from Saint Mary-of-the-Woods College, Master of Arts from Syracuse University, and Juris Doctor from the Seton Hall University School of Law.

Career 
Curran served as a member of the New Jersey General Assembly from the 24th Legislative District from 1974 to 1980. In 1992, Curran was nominated to serve as a Judge of the New Jersey Superior Court by James Florio. She served until February 19, 2000.

Personal life and death 
She died on January 29, 2022, at the age of 81.

References

1940 births
2022 deaths
Lawyers from New York City
Politicians from New York City
21st-century American women
Republican Party members of the New Jersey General Assembly
New Jersey state court judges
People from Summit, New Jersey
Politicians from Union County, New Jersey
Women state legislators in New Jersey
Saint Mary-of-the-Woods College alumni
Syracuse University alumni
Seton Hall University School of Law alumni
American women judges